17 Canis Majoris is a single star in the southern constellation of Canis Major, located 610 light years away from the Sun. It is visible to the naked eye as a dim, white-hued star with an apparent visual magnitude of 5.80. The object is moving closer to the Earth with a heliocentric radial velocity of −13 km/s.

This is an A-type main-sequence star with a stellar classification of A2 V, and is near the end of its main sequence lifetime. It has 2.8 times the mass of the Sun and is spinning with a projected rotational velocity of 43 km/s. The star is radiating 126 times the luminosity of the Sun from its photosphere at an effective temperature of 8,872 K. It has a magnitude 8.66 visual companion at an angular separation of  along a position angle of 147°, as of 2015.

References

A-type main-sequence stars
Canis Major
Durchmusterung objects
Canis Majoris, 17
051055
033248
2588